WGNG (106.3 FM) is a radio station licensed to Tchula, Mississippi, United States, with an urban contemporary format.  The station is owned by Team Communications and serves the Greenville and Greenwood area. On June 1, 2008 the station flipped to Rhythmic contemporary, its first in north central Mississippi. On August 1, 2012 the station changed its format to urban contemporary.

External links 
WGNL & WGNG Facebook

GNG
Urban contemporary radio stations in the United States
Radio stations established in 1997